Estrella Puente (born 22 December 1928) is a Uruguayan former athlete. She competed in the women's javelin throw at the 1952 Summer Olympics. She was the first woman to represent Uruguay at the Olympics.

References

External links
 

1928 births
Possibly living people
Athletes (track and field) at the 1952 Summer Olympics
Uruguayan female javelin throwers
Olympic athletes of Uruguay
Sportspeople from Montevideo
Pan American Games medalists in athletics (track and field)
Pan American Games silver medalists for Uruguay
Athletes (track and field) at the 1955 Pan American Games
Medalists at the 1955 Pan American Games